Laura Gómez is a Dominican actress, writer, and director. Gómez is best known for her portrayal of the character Blanca Flores in the Netflix series Orange Is The New Black. In Fall 2012, she won the NYU Technisphere Award for her short film To Kill a Roach.

Early years
Born in the Dominican Republic, she grew up in Santo Domingo working as an actress and reporter. She moved to New York at the age of 21 to study acting. After three years in the United States, she made her entry into theater and voice work.

Career
In 2011, Gómez was awarded an IX Screenwriting Developing Grant by the Spanish Fundación Carolina. She studied film at the University of New York, and screenwriting at the Jacob Krueger Studio. She wrote, directed and produced the short films To Kill A Roach—for which she received the NYU Fall 2012 Technisphere Award for Outstanding Achievement—and Hallelujah. She directed and co-produced The Iron Warehouse, written by the playwright Hilary Bettis. She appeared as a guest actor in Law & Order SVU, and played a recurring role in the HBO miniseries Show Me a Hero, and a minor role in the film Exposed.

She is a member of Spanish Repertory Theater, with which she has appeared in critically acclaimed theatrical productions such as Doña Flor y sus dos maridos and La casa de los espíritus. Her voice-over work includes Spanish-language announcer for CoverGirl and Suave, and audiobooks including How the García Girls Lost Their Accent, by Julia Álvarez, and The Brief Wondrous Life of Oscar Wao by Junot Díaz.

Filmography

Film
 Sambá as Luna Torres, Dir. Laura Amelia Guzmán-Israel Cárdenas 
 Exposed as Eva de la Cruz, Dir. Declan Dale 
 Trabajo as Lilí, Dir. Nelson Peña 
 Maggie Black as Kim (Co-star), Dir. Stanley Brode 
 Hallelujah as Natalia (Lead), Dir. Laura Gómez 
 To Kill a Roach as Alicia (Lead), Dir. Laura Gómez 
 Pinchos y Rolos (NYILFF) as Elizabeth (Lead), Dir. Freddy Vargas 
 Cheesecake and a Tango as Wife (Lead), Dir. Soleidy Méndez 
 Víctimas del Poder as Wanda (Lead), Dir. Jorge Lendebourg 
 Yo, la peor de todas as Paula (Co-star), Dir. Francisco Lupini 
 Nueva York (Tribeca Film Fest) as Nurse (Co-star), Dir. Manolo Celi 
 Cleaning Law as Laura (Co-star), Dir. Rob López 
 Miniseries de la Vida Real as Wife (Co-star), Dir. Micky Bretón 
 The Bohemians as Waitress (Principal), Dir. José Luis Cortés

Television

References

External links
 

Living people
Dominican Republic actresses
21st-century American actresses
American film actresses
American television actresses
1979 births
People from Santo Domingo